This is an incomplete list of Statutory Instruments of the United Kingdom in 1963. This listing is the complete, 68 items, "Partial Dataset" as listed on www.legislation.gov.uk (as at September 2017).

Statutory Instruments

1-499
The Pipe-lines (Notices) Regulations 1963 SI 1963/151
The Consular Conventions (Kingdom of Denmark) Order 1963 SI 1963/370
The Exchange of Securities Rules 1963 SI 1963/490

500-999
The National Insurance (New Entrants Transitional) Amendment Regulations 1963 SI 1963/502
The Companies Registration Office (Fees) Order 1963 SI 1963/511
The Companies Registration Office (Fees) (No. 2) Order 1963 SI 1963/596
The Prison Commissioners Dissolution Order 1963 SI 1963/597
The Consular Conventions (Spanish State) Order 1963 SI 1963/614
The Consular Conventions (Income Tax) (Kingdom of Denmark) Order 1963 SI 1963/615
The Double Taxation Relief (Taxes on Income) (Israel) Order 1963 SI 1963/616
The National Insurance (Consequential Provisions) Regulations 1963 SI 1963/676
The House to House Collections Regulations 1963 SI 1963/684
The Town and Country Planning (Use Classes) Order 1963 SI 1963/708
The Betting Levy Appeal Tribunal (England and Wales) Rules 1963 SI 1963/748
The Criminal Justice Act, 1961 (Commencement No.2) Order, 1963 SI 1963/755
The Clergy Pensions (Channel Islands) Order 1963 SI 1963/785
The Cycle Racing on Highways (Amendment) Regulations 1963 SI 1963/929
The National Parks and Access to the Countryside (Amendment) Regulations 1963 SI 1963/968
The National Insurance (Modification of the Royal Naval Pension Scheme) (Amendment) Regulations 1963 SI 1963/970
The Manorial Documents (Amendment) Rules 1963 SI 1963/976
The Tithe (Copies of Instruments of Apportionment) (Amendment) Rules 1963 SI 1963/977
The Local Government (Compensation) Regulations 1963 SI 1963/999

1000-1499
Horsey Island Mussel Fishery Order 1963 SI 1963/1005
The Copyright (Falkland Islands) Order 1963 SI 1963/1037
The Copyright (St. Helena) Order 1963 SI 1963/1038
The Air Corporations (General Staff, Pilots and Officers Pensions) (Amendment) Regulations 1963 SI 1963/1068
The Air Corporations (General Staff, Pilots and Officers Pensions) (Amendment) (No.2) Regulations 1963 SI 1963/1108
Transport Boards (Payments for Rating Authorities) Regulations 1963 (1) SI 1963/1109
The Foreign Compensation (Hungary) Order 1963 SI 1963/1148
The Government Annuity Table Order 1963 SI 1963/1178
The Federated Superannuation System for Universities (Reckoning of Certain previous Service) Regulations 1963 SI 1963/1219
The Superannuation (Transfer of Agricultural Staff) Rules, 1963 SI 1963/1220
The Meat Inspection Regulations 1963 SI 1963/1229
The National Insurance (Non-participation-Assurance of Equivalent Pension Benefits) Amendment Regulations, 1963 SI 1963/1265
The Animals (Cruel Poisons) Regulations 1963 SI 1963/1278
The Merchant Shipping (Certificates of Competency as A.B.) (Ghana) Order 1963 SI 1963/1316
The Double Taxation Relief (Estate Duty) (France) Order 1963 SI 1963/1319
The Statistics of Trade Act 1947 (Amendment of Schedule) Order 1963 SI 1963/1329
The Lifting Machines (Particulars of Examinations) Order 1963 SI 1963/1382
The Bread and Flour Regulations 1963 SI 1963/1435
The Schools (Amending) Regulations 1963 SI 1963/1468
The Registration of Government Ships (British Antarctic Territory) Order 1963 SI 1963/1494
The Tribunals and Inquiries (Guernsey) Order 1963 SI 1963/1496

1500-1999
The British Museum Act 1963 (Commencement) Order 1963 SI 1963/1546
The Children and Young Persons Act 1963 (Commencement No.1) Order 1963 SI 1963/1561
The Stock Transfer Act 1963 (Commencement) Order 1963 SI 1963/1592
The Service Departments Registers (Amendment) Order, 1963 SI 1963/1624
The Shipowners' Liability (Colonial Territories) Order in Council 1963 SI 1963/1632
The Government Bearer Bond (Prescribed Securities) Order 1963 SI 1963/1701
The Weights and Measures Regulations 1963 SI 1963/1710
The Registered Securities (Completion of Blank Transfers) Order 1963 SI 1963/1743
The Radioactive Substances (Waste Closed Sources) Exemption Order 1963 SI 1963/1831
The Radioactive Substances (Schools etc.) Exemption Order 1963 SI 1963/1832
The Radioactive Substances (Precipitated Phosphate) Exemption Order 1963 SI 1963/1836
The National Insurance (Modification of the Army Pension Scheme) (Amendment) Regulations 1963 SI 1963/1862
The Radioactive Substances (Waste Closed Sources) Exemption (Scotland) Order 1963 SI 1963/1877 (S. 94)
The Wireless Telegraphy (Control of Interference from Electro-Medical Apparatus) Regulations 1963 SI 1963/1895
The Consular Conventions (Republic of Austria) Order 1963 SI 1963/1927
The Government Bearer Bond (Prescribed Securities) (No.2) Order 1963 SI 1963/1958
The National Insurance (Modification of the Air Force Pension Scheme) (Amendment) Regulations 1963 SI 1963/1987
The National Insurance (Non-participation-Assurance of Equivalent Pension Benefits) Amendment (No.2) Regulations 1963 SI 1963/1988
The National Assistance (Compensation) (Amendment) Regulations, 1963 SI 1963/1991

2000-2126
The Import Duty Reliefs Order 1963 SI 1963/2013
The British Transport Commission (Transfer of Functions) (Appointments and Nominations) Order 1963 SI 1963/2023
The Children and Young Persons Act 1963 (Commencement No.2) Order 1963 SI 1963/2056
The Federation of Rhodesia and Nyasaland (Dissolution) Order in Council 1963 SI 1963/2085
The Consular Conventions (Income Tax) (Republic of Austria) Order 1963 SI 1963/2103
The Vehicles (Conditions of Use on Footpaths) Regulations 1963 SI 1963/2126

Unreferenced Listings
The following 12 items were previously listed on this article, however are unreferenced on the authorities site, included here for a "no loss" approach.
Potts Ghyll Mine (Storage Battery Locomotives) Special Regulations 1963 SI 1963/270
The Road Vehicles (Index Marks) (Amendment) Regulations 1963 SI 1963/494
Sheffield Water (Dearne Valley) Order 1963 SI 1963/572
Doncaster and District Joint Water Board Order 1963 SI 1963/599
North Derbyshire Water Board Order 1962 SI 1963/660
Various Trunk Roads (Prohibition of Waiting) Order 1963 SI 1963/814
Chislet Mine (Electric Trolley Locomotives) Special Regulations 1963 SI 1963/896
Llanharry Mine (Storage Battery Locomotives) Special Regulations 1963 SI 1963/906
Easton Mine (Diesel, Diesel-Electric and Storage Battery Vehicles) Special Regulations 1963 SI 1963/1074
Sabah, Sarawak and Singapore (State Constitutions) Order in Council 1963 SI 1963/1493
Doncaster and District Joint Water Board (No. 2) Order 1963 SI 1963/1736
Slaughter of Animals (Stunning Pens) (Scotland) Regulations 1963 SI 1963/1888

References

External links
Legislation.gov.uk delivered by the UK National Archive
UK SI's on legislation.gov.uk
UK Draft SI's on legislation.gov.uk

See also
List of Statutory Instruments of the United Kingdom

Lists of Statutory Instruments of the United Kingdom
Statutory Instruments